The following outline is provided as an overview of and topical guide to running:

Running – means of rapidly traveling on foot, in which at regular points during the running cycle both feet are off the ground. Running is a key component to a number of sporting events typically in the realm of road racing, track and field or triathlon.

Nature of running 

Running can be described as:

 Exercise
 Aerobic exercise
 A sport
 A component of athletics
 An individual sport
 A team sport (see relay race)
 A form of travel
 Animal locomotion
 Terrestrial locomotion

Forms of running 

Backward running
 Barefoot running
 Sprinting
 Jogging
 ChiRunning
 Level and Incline Running
 Long-distance running – form of continuous running over distances of at least five kilometres (3.1 miles). Physiologically, it is largely aerobic in nature and requires stamina as well as mental strength.

Running sports events 
 Track and field
 Sprints
50 m
55 m
60 m
 100 m
150 m
 200 m
 300 m
 400 m
500 m
Hurdles
50 m
55 m
60 m
100 m
110 m
400 m
 Middle distance running
 800 m
1500 m
 3000 m
Steeplechase
 Long-distance track events
5000 m
10,000 m
One hour run
 Relays
 4 × 100 m
 4 × 200 m
 4 × 400 m
4 × 800 m
Distance medley relay
 Sprint medley relay
 Swedish relay
 Road running
5K
5K race profiles
10K
10K race profiles
Quarter marathon
10-miles
10 mile race profiles
20K
Half marathon
Specific half marathon profiles
Marathon
Specific Argentina marathon profiles
Specific Australian marathon profiles
Specific Canadian marathon profiles
Specific Chinese marathon profiles
Specific European marathon profiles
Specific German marathon profiles
Specific Indian marathon profiles
Specific Japan marathon profiles
Specific Lithuanian marathon profiles
Specific Pakistani marathon profiles
Specific Slovenian marathon profiles
Specific U.K. marathon profiles
Specific U.S. Marathon profiles
Ultramarathon
 Multiday race
 Ekiden
 Off-road running
 Adventure running
Cross country running
Fell running
Fell running competitions
Mountain running
Mountain running events
 Trail running
 Multi-discipline sports of which running is a part:
 Multisports that include running:
 Adventure racing
 Aquathlon
 Duathlon
 Triathlon – which includes running as its final, third component
 Quadrathlon
 Tetrathlon
 Modern pentathlon
 Heptathlon
 Octathlon
 Decathlon
 Tower running

Running venues 
List of largest running events

Running equipment 
 Footwear
Athletic shoe
Racing flats
 Socks
Track spikes
 Cheetah Flex-Foot
 Running shorts
 Timing transponder

Injury prevention 
 Stretching
 Cross-training

Physiology of running 
 Gait

Running injuries 
 Achilles tendon
 Achilles tendinitis
 Achilles tendon rupture
 Foot blisters
 Iliotibial band syndrome
 Pulled muscle
 Pulled hamstring
 Runner's knee
 Runner's toe
 Shin splints
 Sprained ankle
 Stress fractures

History of running 

History of running
 Persistence hunting
 Running in Ancient Greece
 Stadion (running race)
 Dolichos (running race)
 Diaulos (running race)
 History of the marathon
 Four-minute mile

Running organizations
Amateur Athletic Association – the oldest national governing body for athletics in the world, having been established on 24 April 1880.
Athletics Canada
Athletics New Zealand
International Association of Athletics Federations (IAAF)
Asian Athletics Association – sponsor of the Asian Championships
Confederation of African Athletics – sponsor of the African Championships in Athletics
CONSUDATLE – sponsor of the South American Championships in Athletics and the South American Cross Country Championships
European Athletic Association – sponsor of the European Athletics Championships among others
North America, Central America and Caribbean Athletic Association (NACAC) sponsor of the NACAC Championships
Oceania Athletics Association – sponsor of the Oceania Athletics Championships
Road Runners Club of America
UK Athletics
USA Track & Field

Persons influential in running

Great Britain
 Roger Bannister – first person to run the mile in less than 4 minutes.
David Cecil, 6th Marquess of Exeter (1905–1981) – president of the IAAF for 30 years
Sebastian Coe – retired Olympian who heads London's bid for the 2012 Summer Olympics; held all four middle distance world records simultaneously, the 800 m, 1000 m, 1500 m and the mile.
Mo Farah CBE - Britain's most successful distance runner.

France
Pierre de Coubertin (1863–1937) – founder of the modern Olympics

Morocco
Hicham El Guerrouj – current holder of the 1500 metres, mile and outdoor 2000 metres world records, as well as a double Olympic gold medalist. Ran the mile in 3:43.13 in Rome in 1999.

New Zealand
Arthur Lydiard (1917–2004),  runner and coach.

Senegal
Lamine Diack, president of the IAAF since November 1999

United States
Avery Brundage (1887–1975) – long-time president of the International Olympic Committee
Ollan Cassell – long-time head of the USA Track & Field
Ted Corbitt (1919–2007) – founder of the Road Runners Club of America and founding president of New York Road Runners. He led efforts to accurately measure and certify long distance road race courses in the United States.
Jim Fixx – author of the 1977 best-selling book, The Complete Book of Running. He helped start America's fitness revolution, popularizing the sport of running and demonstrating the health benefits of regular jogging.
Don Kardong – past-president of the Road Runners Club of America
Fred Lebow  (1932–1994) – long-time head of the NY Road Runners and creator of the "big city" marathon format
Bill Rodgers – influential runner as both an open and master runner
Steve Roland "Pre" Prefontaine (January 25, 1951 – May 30, 1975) 1971 Olympiad, lifetime runner, 1970s running icon, auto-accident death.

See also 
Eco-running
ChiRunning
Ernst van Aaken
 London UnderRound
Orienteering
 Racewalking
20 km walk
 Wheelchair racing

References

External links 

 
 

Running
Running

Physical exercise
Aerobic exercise